François Golse (born 10 September 1962 in Talence) is a French mathematician.

Golse was awarded a doctorate in 1986 at the Paris XIII University with thesis advisor Claude Bardos and thesis Contributions à l'étude des équations du transfert radiatif. In 1987 he became a scientist of CNRS at the École normale supérieure. In 1993 he became a professor at Pierre and Marie Curie University (Paris VI). He has been a professor at the École Polytechnique since 2006.

Golse does research on partial differential equations. With Laure Saint-Raymond in 2004 he showed a connection of the weak solutions of the Boltzmann equation with the Leray solutions of the incompressible Navier-Stokes equations. For these mathematically rigorous results on the hydrodynamic limit of the Boltzmann equation of gas dynamics he received the SIAG-APDE Prize of SIAM (for the best work on partial differential equations) with Saint-Raymond in 2006. He also deals with other equations of mathematical physics, including distribution of free path lengths in the Lorentz gas, hydrodynamic limits of other kinetic equations, and time-dependent Hartree–Fock method.

In 2004 he gave a plenary lecture Hydrodynamic limits at the European Congress of Mathematicians. In 2006 he was an Invited Speaker with talk The periodic Lorentz gas in the Boltzmann-Grad limit at the International Congress of Mathematicians in Madrid.

He is a member of the Institut Universitaire de France. He received the Louis Armand Prize of the French Academy of Sciences and the Claude Antoine Peccot Prize of the Collège de France.

Major publications
 Golse, François; Lions, Pierre-Louis; Perthame, Benoît; Sentis, Rémi. Regularity of the moments of the solution of a transport equation. J. Funct. Anal. 76 (1988), no. 1, 110–125.
 Bardos, Claude; Golse, François; Levermore, David. Fluid dynamic limits of kinetic equations. I. Formal derivations. J. Statist. Phys. 63 (1991), no. 1-2, 323–344.
 Bardos, Claude; Golse, François; Levermore, C. David. Fluid dynamic limits of kinetic equations. II. Convergence proofs for the Boltzmann equation. Comm. Pure Appl. Math. 46 (1993), no. 5, 667–753. 
 Golse, François; Saint-Raymond, Laure. The Navier-Stokes limit of the Boltzmann equation for bounded collision kernels. Invent. Math. 155 (2004), no. 1, 81–161. doi:10.1007/s00222-003-0316-5

References

External links
 Homepage at the École Polytechnique

20th-century French mathematicians
21st-century French mathematicians
University of Paris alumni
Academic staff of Pierre and Marie Curie University
Academic staff of École Polytechnique
PDE theorists
1962 births
Living people